The glaucous gull (Larus hyperboreus) is a large gull, the second-largest gull in the world.  It breeds in Arctic regions of the Northern Hemisphere and winters south to shores of the Holarctic. The genus name is from Latin larus, which appears to have referred to a gull or other large seabird. The specific name hyperboreus is Latin for "northern" from the Ancient Greek Huperboreoi people from the far north  "Glaucous" is from Latin glaucus and denotes the grey colour of the gull. An older English name for this species is burgomaster.

This gull is migratory, wintering from in the North Atlantic and North Pacific Oceans as far south as the British Isles and northernmost states of the United States, also on the Great Lakes. A few birds sometimes reach the southern USA and northern Mexico.

Description

This is a large and powerful gull, second-largest of all gull species and very pale in all plumage, with no black on either the wings or the tail. Adults are pale grey above, with a thick, yellow bill. Juveniles are very pale grey with a pink and black bill. This species is considerably larger, bulkier, and thicker-billed than the similar Iceland gull, and can sometimes equal the size of the great black-backed gull, the oft-titled largest gull species. In some areas, glaucous gulls are about the same weight as great black-backed gulls or even heavier, and their maximum weight is greater. They take four years to reach maturity.

The call is a "laughing" cry similar to that of the herring gull, but deeper.

Subspecies
The four recognized subspecies are:

 L. h. hyperboreus, Gunnerus, 1767:  nominate, found from northern Europe to north-western Siberia
 L. h. pallidissimus, Portenko, 1939: found from north-western Siberia to the Bering Sea - the largest subspecies, paler than hyperboreus with bright raspberry pink legs (possibly due to diet).
 L. h. barrovianus, Ridgway, 1886: found from Alaska to north-west Canada - the smallest subspecies, with a darker mantle, shorter bill and longer wings than hyperboreus. First-year immature is generally darker and more strongly-marked than hyperboreus.
 L. h. leuceretes, Schleep, 1819: found from north-central Canada to Greenland and Iceland - Averages slightly paler than hyperboreus. Olsen & Larsson (2003) in Gulls of Europe, Asia and North America consider it synonymous with nominate hyperboreus.

Ecology
This species of seagull breeds colonially or singly on coasts and cliffs, making a lined nest on the ground or cliff. Normally, two to four light brown eggs with dark brown splotches are laid.

These are omnivores like most Larus gulls, and they eat fish, insects, molluscs, starfish, offal, scraps, eggs, small birds, small mammals, and carrion, as well as seeds, berries, and grains.

References

External links

 Glaucous gull , Alaska Seabird Information Series
 
 
 
 
 
 
 

Larus
Birds of the Arctic
Birds described in 1767
Taxa named by Johan Ernst Gunnerus
Articles containing video clips
Holarctic birds